Juha Tapani Rehula (born 3 June 1963 in Hollola, Finland) is a Finnish politician and the vice chairman of the Finnish Centre Party.  Rehula worked as the Minister of Social Affairs and Health in Finland between 2010–2011 and Minister of Family Affairs and Social Services 2015–2017. He was a member of the Finnish Parliament from 1996 until 2019.

As a minister of Family Affairs and Social Services, Rehula was one of the three key ministers in the area of social policy and income. The project of negative income tax was shared with Rehula, Minister of Social Affairs and Health Hanna Mäntylä, and Minister of Justice and Labour Jari Lindström.

References

1963 births
Living people
People from Hollola
Centre Party (Finland) politicians
Ministers of Social Affairs of Finland
Members of the Parliament of Finland (1995–99)
Members of the Parliament of Finland (1999–2003)
Members of the Parliament of Finland (2003–07)
Members of the Parliament of Finland (2007–11)
Members of the Parliament of Finland (2011–15)
Members of the Parliament of Finland (2015–19)